TaleSpin is a platform game for the Sega Genesis, TurboGrafx-16, and Game Gear. It is based on the Disney animated series of the same name. Sega released the game on the Sega Mega Drive/Genesis in 1992 and Game Gear in 1993. NEC made its own game for their TurboGrafx-16 system in 1991.

Plot
This game involves the adventures of Baloo and Kit Cloudkicker, two bears delivering cargo for Rebecca Cunningham, another bear. However, Shere Khan, the evil tiger tycoon, wants to put Rebecca out of business, so he hires air pirates, led by Don Karnage, to do his dirty work.

In the Sega Genesis and Game Gear games, Baloo and Kit face up against Shere Khan's company in a contest to earn a lifetime work contract from the city of Cape Suzette. 

In the TurboGrafx game, Louie tells Baloo of an ancient artifact, the pieces of which are scattered across the road.

Gameplay

Mega Drive/Genesis
The Sega Mega Drive/Genesis version of the game is a platform game for up to two players, playing as either Baloo or Kit. The aim of each level is to collect at least 10 cargo boxes in order to open the exit.

TurboGrafx-16
The TurboGrafx version is also a platform game, in which players play as Baloo. There is also a bonus level where players control the plane pulling Kit behind him.

Game Gear
The Game Gear version is a platform game, similar to the Mega Drive/Genesis version, in which players can again control either Baloo or Kit and have to collect cargo boxes through the levels.

Reception

See also
List of Disney video games

References

External links

TaleSpin Games

1991 video games
Disney video games
Sega video games
Game Gear games
Platform games
Sega Genesis games
Video game
Tiger Electronics handheld games
TurboGrafx-16 games
Video games about bears
Video games based on animated television series
Video games developed in the United States
The Jungle Book (Disney) video games

fr:Disney's TaleSpin (jeu vidéo, 1991)